Mudrik or Mudřík (Czech feminine: Mudříková) is a surname. Notable people with this surname include:
 Bohumil Mudřík (born 1941), Czech gymnast
 Eduard Mudrik (1939–2017), Soviet footballer

See also
 
 Mudryk, a cognate surname